A Stir of Echoes is a  supernatural novel by American writer Richard Matheson, published in 1958. It served as the inspiration for the 1999 film Stir of Echoes.

Plot synopsis
Tom Wallace lived an ordinary life, until a chance event awakened psychic abilities he never knew he possessed. Now he's hearing the private thoughts of the people around him and learning shocking secrets he never wanted to know. But as Tom's existence becomes a waking nightmare, even greater jolts are in store as he becomes the unwilling recipient of a message from beyond the grave.

Reception
Galaxy reviewer Floyd C. Gale praised the novel, saying "Matheson expertly builds a mood of horror and terror that only on one occasion exceeds credulity." Damon Knight, however, dismissed it as "a thin and banal ghost story with psi trimmings, written in a Chippendale Chinese style."

References

1958 American novels
1958 fantasy novels
American novels adapted into films
American horror novels
Novels by Richard Matheson
J. B. Lippincott & Co. books
Novels about telepathy